Metirosine (INN and BAN; α-Methyltyrosine, Metyrosine USAN, AMPT) is an antihypertensive drug. It inhibits the enzyme tyrosine hydroxylase and, therefore, catecholamine synthesis, which, as a consequence, depletes the levels of the catecholamines dopamine, adrenaline and noradrenaline in the body.

It is available as a generic medication.

Clinical use
Metirosine has been shown to suppress catecholamine synthesis and alleviate symptoms related to catecholamine excess, including hypertension, headache, tachycardia, constipation, and tremor. Metirosine is primarily used to reduce these symptoms in patients with pheochromocytoma. It is contraindicated for the treatment of essential hypertension.

Metirosine is used as an off-label treatment for DiGeorge syndrome.

Metirosine is used in scientific research to investigate the effects of catecholamine depletion on behavior. There is evidence that catecholamine depletion causes an increase in sleepiness that is more pronounced than sleep deprivation, and that the fatigue lingers after the drug is discontinued. Catecholamine depletion has also been linked to a negative mood, though this is reported less often than sleepiness.

See also
 p-Chlorophenylalanine

References

External links 
 

Antihypertensive agents
Phenethylamines
Phenols
Tyrosine hydroxylase inhibitors